Jan Rafael Shcherbakovski (born 24 March 2001) is a Belarusian professional footballer who plays as a right midfielder or right-back for German club FC Energie Cottbus, on loan from Dynamo Dresden.

Club career

Hallescher FC
Born in Mogilev, Belarus, Schcherbakovski grew up in Berlin. After playing youth football for Hertha Zehlendorf, SFC Stern 1900 and Hertha BSC, Shcherbakovski signed for 3. Liga club Hallescher FC in summer 2019. After 6 appearances in the 2019–20 3. Liga, it was announced in May 2020 that Shcherbakovski had signed a contract with the club until summer 2022. On his first start for Halle on 16 March 2021, he scored his first goal for the club with a finish from 8 yards in a 1–1 draw with MSV Duisburg, but was substituted off at half-time. It was his only goal in 10 appearances during the 2020–21 3. Liga. The 2021–22 season was a breakthrough season for Shcherbakovski, as he appeared in all but two of Halle's 38 matches and scored 4 goals.

Dynamo Dresden
On 31 May 2022, it was announced that newly-relegated 3. Liga club Dynamo Dresden had signed Shcherbakovski on a three-year contract following the expiry of his deal at Halle. On 31 January 2023, he was loaned to FC Energie Cottbus in Regionalliga Nordost for the rest of the 2022–23 season.

International career
Shcherbakovski has been capped for Belarus U19 national team in friendly matches, but yet to make a debut for any selection in an official competition.

Career statistics

References

External links
 
 
 

2001 births
Living people
Belarusian footballers
Belarus youth international footballers
People from Mogilev
Association football midfielders
Association football fullbacks
Hallescher FC players
Dynamo Dresden players
FC Energie Cottbus players
3. Liga players
Belarusian expatriate footballers
Belarusian expatriate sportspeople in Germany
Expatriate footballers in Germany
Sportspeople from Mogilev Region